The 10th Senate district of Wisconsin is one of 33 districts in the Wisconsin State Senate.  Located in northwest Wisconsin, the district comprises most of Polk and St. Croix counties, as well as the western half of Burnett County, parts of western and central Dunn County, and part of northern Pierce County.  The district includes the cities of Hudson, Menomonie, New Richmond, River Falls, and St. Croix Falls.  It also contains landmarks such as Kinnickinnic State Park and the Saint Croix National Scenic Riverway.

Current elected officials
Rob Stafsholt is the senator representing the 10th district.  He was first elected in the 2020 general election. He previously served four years in the Wisconsin State Assembly.

Each Wisconsin State Senate district is composed of three State Assembly districts.  The 10th Senate district comprises the 28th, 29th, and 30th Assembly districts.  The current representatives of those districts are: 
 Assembly District 28: Gae Magnafici (R–Dresser)
 Assembly District 29: Clint Moses (R–Menomonie)
 Assembly District 30: Shannon Zimmerman (R–River Falls)

The portion of the 10th Senate district in Dunn County is part of Wisconsin's 3rd congressional district, which is represented by U.S. Representative Derrick Van Orden. The remainder of the district falls within Wisconsin's 7th congressional district, represented by U.S. Representative Tom Tiffany.

Past senators
Note: the boundaries of districts have changed repeatedly over history. Previous politicians of a specific numbered district have represented a completely different geographic area, due to redistricting.

The district has previously been represented by:

Notes

External links
10th Senate District, Senator Leibham in the Wisconsin Blue Book (2005–2006)
Senator Sheila Harsdorf official campaign site

Wisconsin State Senate districts
Burnett County, Wisconsin
Polk County, Wisconsin
Dunn County, Wisconsin
St. Croix County, Wisconsin
Pierce County, Wisconsin
1848 establishments in Wisconsin